Nine Gold Coast News is a weeknight, local news bulletin of the Nine Network. It is screened on the Gold Coast, Queensland relay of Channel Nine from Brisbane. The bulletin first aired in 1996.

Unlike all Nine News bulletins, the Gold Coast bulletin runs for thirty minutes every weeknight. It comprises mainly local news, as well as sport, weather and boating.

Nine Gold Coast News is a regional news service for the Gold Coast, presented by Bruce Paige and Eva Milic and weather is presented by Luke Bradnam. The bulletin airs at 5:30pm on weeknights as an opt-out broadcast on QTQ-9's Gold Coast transmitters, before the main 6pm Brisbane edition of Nine News. Produced from the network's studios at Surfers Paradise, Nine Gold Coast News is also simulcast on local Gold Coast radio station Juice107.3.

Current presenters

Past presenters

Reporters 

 Mackenzie Colahan
 Jordan Fabris
 Kathryn Foran
 Nick Kelly
 Natasha Pruchniewicz
 Annie Pullar
 Chloe Robinson
 Tracey Smith
 Brendon Wolf
 Courtney Zagel
 Petrina Zaphir

See also

References

External links

Australian television news shows
Nine News
Television shows set in Gold Coast, Queensland